Provincial elections were held in the Pakistani province of Khyber Pakhtunkhwa to elect the members of the 10th Provincial Assembly of Khyber Pakhtunkhwa on 11 May 2013, alongside nationwide general elections and three other provincial elections in Sindh, Balochistan and Punjab. The remaining two territories of Pakistan, AJK and Gilgit-Baltistan, were ineligible to vote due to their disputed status.

Background
In the 2008 elections, the ANP, a secular, leftist and Pashtun nationalist party, won the elections, prompting them to form a coalition government with the centre-left Pakistan Peoples Party.

This coalition government was said to be riddled with corruption and poor governance, leading to common mistrust with the government.

Campaign

Overall throughout the campaign, there were three main contenders: Awami National Party, the party in government for the past five years; the Jamiat Ulema-e-Islam (F), a religious party or the Pakistan Tehreek-e-Insaf, a welfarist, centrist party led by former cricketer Imran Khan.

Opinion polls were consistently showing that Pakistan Tehreek-e-Insaf were making deep inroads into the province of Khyber Pakhtunkhwa, being close to even forming a government.

The parties campaigned on multiple different policy platforms: Pakistan Tehreek-e-Insaf campaigned on a Third Way, Welfarist and anti-establishment platform, attempting to attract disillusioned voters of mainstream parties; the Jamiat Ulema-e-Islam (F) campaigned on religious issues such as the enforcement of Islamic Law and the Pakistan Muslim League (N) mainly campaigned against the leftist policies of the federal PPP government and vowed to tackle the energy conservation crisis.

Results
Pakistan Tehreek-e-Insaf, led by former cricketer Imran Khan emerged as the largest party in the province with 48 seats. While this was a considerably higher number than the second largest party, (Jamiat Ulema-e-Islam (F), with 16 seats), it was still 15 seats short of a majority government.

Aftermath
Following the elections, Pakistan Tehreek-e-Insaf formed a coalition government with Jamaat-e-Islami and the Qaumi Watan Party, giving them 15 extra seats. As well as this, 9 out of the 14 independents elected joined PTI, giving them a comfortable majority in the assembly.

Following this, Pervez Khattak was elected as Chief Minister of Khyber Pakhtunkhwa, securing 84 out of 124 votes.

References

2013 elections in Pakistan
2013